Daffodil International School is a school in Dhaka District, Bangladesh, owned by the Daffodil Family. It was founded in 2009. It has branches in Chandpur, Dhanmondi, Gazipur, Shohanbag, and Uttara, Bangladesh. It is associated with Daffodil International University.

Academic

Medium of Education 
 English Medium
 English Version

References

Schools in Dhaka District
Educational institutions established in 2000
2000 establishments in Bangladesh